Col. Josiah Quincy I (1710–1784) was an American merchant, planter, soldier, and politician. He was the son of Col. Edmund Quincy III and Dorothy Flynt Quincy.  He was named after his grandfather, Rev. Josiah Flynt.  After graduating from Harvard in 1728, he returned to Braintree, Massachusetts (Quincy).  In 1735 he moved to Boston and engaged in commerce and shipbuilding.  He returned to Braintree in 1748.  Josiah was an American Patriot and supporter.  He wrote to General George Washington about British troop movements and was a friend of Benjamin Franklin.

Life
He was in business with brother Edmund.  He and his father traveled in Europe making contacts and contracts to promote the business.  When his firm's ship, Bethel, captured the Spanish ship Jesus Maria and Joseph in 1748, he retired from that business and went back to Braintree.  He was a local magistrate and a colonel of the Suffolk Regiment who made investments.   He went to Pennsylvania as a commissioner in 1755 to ask for assistance in a proposed expedition to Crown Point in the French and Indian War.  Benjamin Franklin helped him and remained a friend. In retirement, Franklin assisted Quincy and Joseph Palmer in several speculative business ventures involving glass, candle and chocolate making.

Family 
He married Hanna Sturgis in 1733.  They had: Edmund, Samuel, Hannah, and Josiah.  Hanna died in 1755. Josiah married Elizabeth Waldron and they had Elizabeth.  He married Ann Marsh after his second wife died and they had Nancy and Frances.   Josiah Quincy died in 1784.

Josiah's sons Samuel and Josiah took part in the trial of Captain Thomas Preston for the murders committed at the Boston Massacre.  Samuel, who was a Tory, was in charge of the prosecution as the solicitor-general.  His younger brother Josiah Quincy II, an outspoken critic of the British and proponent for an American Revolution, and John Adams were the defending counsel.

See also
 Quincy political family

References

Harvard University alumni
Quincy family
1710 births
1784 deaths